The 93d (or 93rd) Military Police Battalion of the United States Army was formed in June 1945 and has operated in World War II, the Korean and Vietnam wars, the Gulf War, and the Iraq War.

Mission 
The 93d Military Police Battalion deploys worldwide to conduct Military Police operations, and conducts continuous law and order operations in support of the Fort Bliss military community.

Organization 
The battalion is subordinate to 89th Military Police Brigade. It numbers over 800 soldiers who are stationed at its headquarters at Fort Bliss, Texas.

The battalion consists of one Headquarters and Headquarters Detachment, two Law Enforcement Detachments - the 72nd Military Police Detachment and the 513th Military Working Dog (MWD) detachment -  and four Military Police Companies:
 202nd Military Police Company
 212th Military Police Company
 591st Military Police Company
 978th Military Police Company

History

World War II 
Activated in France on 13 June 1945 in the towards the end of World War II, the unit served in France during the end of the war before being deactivated on 12 November 1945 in France.

Korean War 
On 28 October 1951, the 93d MP BN was reactivated to serve in the Korean War.

Vietnam War 
The 93d MP BN was reactivated at Fort Sill, Oklahoma on 1 June 1966 and deployed to South East Asia.

Operation Desert Storm 
The 93d MP BN was reactivated in Germany on 16 October 1986 and deployed to South West Asia.

Operation Iraqi Freedom 
The 93d MP BN was reactivated at Fort Bliss, Texas on 17 November 2007 and deployed to Iraq.

n Oct. 2013, the 93D Military Police Battalion deployed to Guantanamo, Cuba, in support of Operation Enduring Freedom.

References

Military police battalions of the United States Army